The Dandenong Valley Highway is an urban highway stretching almost 40 kilometres from Bayswater in Melbourne's eastern suburbs to Frankston in the south. This name covers many consecutive streets and is not widely known to most drivers, as the entire allocation is still best known as by the names of its constituent parts: Stud Road, Foster Street, Dandenong-Frankston Road, Dandenong Road West and Fletcher Road. This article will deal with the entire length of the corridor for sake of completion, as well to avoid confusion between declarations.

The traffic on the highway has been significant over the years with the worst bottlenecks at Burwood Highway, Ferntree Gully Road, Wellington Road, Princes Highway, and Thompsons Road, but since the opening of the EastLink, the traffic burden has significantly reduced along the highway with the north–south tollway, opening to traffic on 29 June 2008.

Route
Stud Road starts at the intersection with Mountain Highway in Bayswater and heads south as a four-lane, dual-carriageway road, crossing Burwood Highway at Wantirna South (and the beginning of Dandenong Valley Highway), where it widens to a six-lane, dual-carriageway road (sharing a dedicated bus lane on-and-off) and continues south through Scoresby to Rowville, crossing Wellington Road and narrowing back to a four-lane, dual-carriageway road. It continues south to Dandenong, narrowing further to a four-lane, single-carriageway road south past David Street, changes names to Foster Street south of Clow Street, to the intersection with Princes Highway through central Dandenong. Running concurrent along Princes Highway, it resumes running south along Frankston-Dandenong Road as a four-lane, dual-carriageway road through Dandenong South and Carrum Downs, where it eventually crosses west under the Frankston railway line (at the end of Dandenong Valley Highway) as Overton Road, then turns immediately south along Dandenong Road West as a dual-lane single-carriageway road, all the way along Fletcher Road, where it briefly becomes a four-lane, dual-carriageway road again before it terminates at Nepean Highway in Frankston.

History
The elimination of the railway crossing where Dandenong-Frankston Road crossed the Pakenham railway line in Dandenong commenced in 1956, carried out by the Dandenong Shire Council, with assistance from Victorian Railways and the Country Roads Board, and completed in 1957, with the eastern half of a four-lane overpass over the railway completed and open to traffic in September, and the western half completed not long afterwards.

The entire alignment (as its constituent roads) was signed as Metropolitan Route 9 between Wantirna and Frankston in 1965. It was re-routed from Dandenong Road East and Beach Street through Frankston to its current alignment when the Beach Street railway crossing was eliminated in 1991.

The passing of the Transport Act of 1983 (itself an evolution from the original Highways and Vehicles Act of 1924) provided for the declaration of State Highways, roads two-thirds financed by the State government through the Road Construction Authority (later VicRoads). The Stud Highway and Dandenong-Frankston Highway were declared State Highways in March 1990, from Burwood Highway in Wantirna South to the Princes Highway in Dandenong (as Stud Highway), and from there to the Wells Road/Overton Road intersection just north of Frankston (as Dandenong-Frankston Highway). These two highways were fused into one only 9 months later, and re-declared as the Dandenong Valley Highway in December 1990, in the same alignment as the previous highways, from Wantirna South to Frankston; however all roads were known (and signposted) as their constituent parts.

The passing of the Road Management Act 2004 granted the responsibility of overall management and development of Victoria's major arterial roads to VicRoads: in 2004, VicRoads declared the road as Dandenong Valley Highway (Arterial #6090), from Burwood Highway in Wantirna South to Wells Road crossing underneath the Frankston railway line in Frankston, while re-declaring the remaining roads within the corridor as Stud Road (Arterial #5796), Klauer Road (today Klauer Street, Wells Road and Dandenong Road West) (Arterial #5159) and Fletcher Road (Arterial #5974), and as before, all roads are still presently known (and signposted) as their constituent parts.

Major intersections

See also

References

Highways and freeways in Melbourne
Dandenong, Victoria
Transport in the City of Greater Dandenong
Transport in the City of Knox
Transport in the City of Frankston